The 31st Infantry Division was a division of the Philippine Army under the United States Army Forces in the Far East (USAFFE).

Organization

History
It was active from November 18, 1941 to April 9, 1942, whereupon it surrendered when Bataan fell.  It was organized and trained in Zambales Province of Northern Luzon.  Col. (later BGen.) Clifford Bluemel (USA) was the division's commander. Col. Pastor C. Martelino (PA), a 1920 U.S. Military Academy graduate, was his chief of staff.

Combat Narrative
At the opening of hostilities, 8 December 1941, the 31st Division formed a part of BGen. (later LGen.) Jonathan M. Wainwright's North Luzon Force of the Philippine Army (later renamed I Philippine Corps), alongside the 11th and 21st Divisions, and the 26th Cavalry Regiment.  

The 31st was initially headquartered at San Mateo, Rizal, but most of its personnel were training at San Marcelino, Zambales, near Subic Bay, when hostilities broke out.

Order of Battle

 31st Infantry Regiment (PA)
 32nd Infantry Regiment (PA)
 33rd Infantry Regiment (PA) (Col. Edwin H. Johnson)
 31st Field Artillery Regiment (PA) 
 31st FA Regt HQ Company 
 1st Bn/31st FA Regt (PA) (75mm guns, 16x)
 2nd Bn/31st FA Regt (PA) (2.95-inch pack howitzers, 4x) 
 3rd Bn/31st FA Regt (PA) 
 31st Engineer Battalion (PA) 
 31st Division Units  
 31st Division Headquarters & HQ Company  
 31st Medical Battalion 
 31st Signal Company  
 31st Quartermaster Company (Motorized)  
 31st QM Transport Company (Truck)

Sources

Bibliography
Morton, Louis. The Fall of the Philippines (Publication 5-2) . Retrieved on 14 Feb 2017.

References

Infantry divisions of the Philippines
Military units and formations of the Philippine Army in World War II
Military units and formations established in 1941
Military units and formations disestablished in 1942